The Costume Designers Guild Award for Excellent in Period Film is one of the annual awards given by the Costume Designers Guild. Before 2005, the category was combined to also include fantasy films. The 1998 inaugural awards year combined period, fantasy and contemporary films.

Winners and Nominees for Film

1990s

Winners and Nominees for Period/Fantasy Film

1990s

2000s

Winners and Nominees for Period Film

2000s

2010s

2020s

References

Costume Designers Guild Awards
2000s in American cinema
2010s in American cinema
Awards for film costume design